"DooDah!" is a song by the Danish group Cartoons. It was released in 1998 on FLEX Records and EMI as the debut single and as well as the second track from their debut studio album, Toonage (1998). The song is a Eurodance cover of Camptown Races with completely different lyrics that were written by Jesper Dukholt (Sponge), Erling Jensen (Shooter) and Martin Østengaard (Toonie) and produced by Michael Pfundheller, Sponge and Toonie.

Track listing

Charts

Weekly charts

Year-end charts

References

External links
 
 
 
 
 

1998 debut singles
1998 songs
Cartoons (band) songs
EMI Records singles